The 2018–19 FIA World Endurance Championship was the seventh season of the FIA World Endurance Championship, an auto racing series co-organised by the Fédération Internationale de l'Automobile (FIA) and the Automobile Club de l'Ouest (ACO). The series is open to Le Mans Prototypes and grand tourer-style racing cars divided into four categories. The season marked the first move to a winter schedule for the championship, with the season starting at the Circuit de Spa-Francorchamps in May 2018 and concluding at the 24 Hours of Le Mans in June 2019.  World championship titles were awarded for LMP drivers, GTE drivers, LMP1 teams and GTE manufacturers.

Schedule
The series announced a provisional schedule on 1 September 2017 that shifted the season calendar from a spring to autumn layout with the 24 Hours of Le Mans marque event held in the middle of the championship, to one running from the May 2018 and to June 2019, including two runnings of Le Mans. This "super season" of eight races spans across more than a year instead of the usual eight months. This shift in calendar length allows the following 2019–20 season to return to a shorter length by starting in the autumn and concluding at Le Mans in the summer.

The schedule does not include the Circuit of the Americas, Bahrain, Mexico City, or the Nürburgring which were all part of the 2017 championship. In addition to Le Mans being included in both 2018 and 2019, the 6 Hours of Spa-Francorchamps is also  run twice. Sebring International Raceway returns to the series for the first time since the inaugural season in 2012, although the WEC does not participate in the WeatherTech SportsCar Championship's 12 Hours of Sebring. The WeatherTech series  runs their race the day after WEC's 8-hour, 1,000-mile event.

The schedule was revised two weeks later with the announcement of the eighth round of the championship, returning to Silverstone Circuit in the United Kingdom. The unannounced event was originally planned for February 2019, with negotiations taking place over a return to Mexico City. With the Mexico City deal failing to materialize, the event at Silverstone was moved to August 2018 to bridge the gap between Le Mans and the Asian rounds of the series starting in October. Further, the Fuji and Shanghai rounds had their dates changed, however Fuji was later returned to its originally scheduled date.

Teams and drivers

LMP1

LMP2
In accordance with the Le Mans Prototype LMP2 regulations for 2017, all cars use the Gibson GK428 4.2 L V8 engine.

LMGTE Pro

LMGTE Am

Results and standings

Race results
The highest finishing competitor entered in the World Endurance Championship is listed below. Invitational entries may have finished ahead of WEC competitors in individual races.

Drivers' championships
Four titles are offered to drivers, two with world championship status. The LMP World Endurance Drivers' Championship is reserved for LMP1 and LMP2 drivers while the GTE World Endurance Drivers' Championship is available for drivers in the LMGTE categories. FIA Endurance Trophies are awarded in LMP2 and in LMGTE Am.

Entries were required to complete the timed race as well as to complete 70% of the overall winning car's race distance in order to earn championship points. A single bonus point was awarded to the team and all drivers of the pole position car for each category in qualifying. Furthermore, a race must complete two laps under green flag conditions in order for championship points to be awarded.

World Endurance LMP Drivers' Championship

World Endurance GTE Drivers' Championship

Endurance Trophy for LMP2 Drivers

Endurance Trophy for LMGTE Am Drivers

Manufacturers' and teams' championships
A world championship for LMGTE manufacturers is awarded, while the former title for manufacturers in LMP1 has been replaced by a world championship for LMP1 teams. FIA Endurance Trophies are awarded for LMP2 and LMGTE Am teams, while the former trophy for LMGTE Pro teams had been eliminated for 2018.

World Endurance LMP1 Championship
Points are awarded only for the highest finishing competitor from each team.

World Endurance GTE Manufacturers' Championship
The two highest finishing competitors from each manufacturer are awarded points.

Endurance Trophy for LMP2 Teams

Endurance Trophy for LMGTE Am Teams

References

External links
 
 2018/2019 FIA World Endurance Championship - Sporting Regulations, www.fia.com, as archived at web.archive.org

 
FIA World Endurance Championship seasons
World Endurance Championship
World Endurance Championship